David Alejandro Zalzman Guevara (born March 4, 1996) is a Venezuelan footballer who plays as a midfielder for Monagas in the Venezuelan Primera División.

Career statistics

Club

Notes

References

External links
 David Zalzman at the University of Memphis

1996 births
Living people
Venezuelan footballers
Venezuela youth international footballers
Venezuelan expatriate footballers
Association football midfielders
FC Barcelona players
Deportivo Anzoátegui players
Memphis Tigers men's soccer players
OKC Energy FC players
Des Moines Menace players
Memphis City FC players
Portland Timbers draft picks
Deportivo Táchira F.C. players
Venezuelan Primera División players
Venezuelan expatriate sportspeople in Spain
Expatriate footballers in Spain
Venezuelan expatriate sportspeople in the United States
Expatriate soccer players in the United States
Sportspeople from Maracay
21st-century Venezuelan people